Marcus Whiffen (4 March 1916 - February 2002) was an English architectural journalist, historian, author and photographer specialising in British and American architecture. He was Professor Emeritus in the School of Architecture at Arizona State University.

Life and career 
Marcus Whiffen was born in Ross-on-Wye, Herefordshire on 4 March 1916, the son of Thomas Joseph Whiffen and Jessie Anne Hardy.

He graduated from Cambridge University with a BA in 1937, and then completed his MA in 1946.

Following his graduation, he joined The Architect and Building News in 1937. After the war, in 1946, he joined the Architectural Review (London) as assistant editor.

Whiffen moved to the United States in 1952, where he held lecturer positions at Massachusetts Institute of Technology and then at the University of Texas.  In 1954 he joined Colonial Williamsburg as architectural historian. He moved to Arizona State University in 1960 where he held various positions, and finally as Professor Emeritus. He corresponded extensively with several other leading architectural historians including Sir Nikolaus Pevsner, Henry-Russell Hitchcock and Sir John Summerson, plus architects including Walter Gropius, Paul Schweikher, and Bart Prince.

Whiffen served as director of the Society of Architectural Historians (1969-1971, 1975-1978) and director of the Association of Collegiate Schools of Architecture (1963-1968). His awards included the Society of Architectural Historians Annual Book Award for The Public Buildings of Williamsburg (1958) and the Arizona State University Alumni Association Faculty Achievement Award (1979).

Marcus Whiffen lived in a house designed for him in 1963 by architect (and Arizona State University colleague) Calvin C. Straub in the Arcadia district of Phoenix, Arizona. He died, aged 85, in Phoenix in February 2002.

Photographs by Marcus Whiffen are held at the Conway Library in the Courtauld, London, and are being digitised.

Select bibliography 
 Stuart and Georgian churches: the Architecture of the Church of England outside London 1603-1837.  Marcus Whiffen. B. T. Batsford, 1948. 
 Thomas Archer: Architect of the English Baroque. Marcus Whiffen, Art & Technics, 1950. 
 The Architecture of Sir Charles Barry in Manchester and Neighbourhood. Marcus Whiffen.  Manchester, 1950.
 An Introduction to Elizabethan and Jacobean Architecture. Marcus Whiffen. Art & Technics, 1952. 
 The Public Buildings of Williamsburg - colonial capital of Virginia - an architectural history. Marcus Whiffen. Williamsburg, Va. Colonial Williamsburg, 1958. 
 American Architecture, 1607-1976. Marcus Whiffen. Cambridge: MIT Pr. 1981. 
 The Eighteenth-century houses of Williamsburg - a study of architecture and building in the colonial capital of Virginia.  Marcus Whiffen. Williamsburg, Va. Colonial Williamsburg Foundation, 1983. 
  Pueblo deco: The art deco architecture of the Southwest. Marcus Whiffen and Carla Breeze. Albuquerque. University of New Mexico Press, c1984. 
 American architecture since 1780: a guide to the styles.  Marcus Whiffen. Cambridge, Mass. London: MIT, 1992.

References 

Architectural historians
People from Ross-on-Wye
1916 births
Arizona State University faculty
2002 deaths
People from Phoenix, Arizona